Kakka was a Mesopotamian god best known as the sukkal (attendant deity or divine messenger) of Anu and Anshar. His cult center was Maškan-šarrum, most likely located in the north of modern Iraq on the banks of the Tigris.

A deity named Kakka was also worshiped in Mari in modern Syria, but there is no consensus among experts whether this was the same deity. It has been argued that the Mariote Kakka was a goddess, rather than a god. It is assumed she functioned as a deity associated with medicine.

Name
The origin of Kakka's name is most likely not Sumerian or Akkadian, but rather Amorite. A deity named dga-ga (a common writing of Kakka's name) is nonetheless already attested in the Early Dynastic god list from Abu Salabikh. The god list An = Anum provides the gloss dgaka-kaga, indicating dga-ga was pronounced as Kakka.

Multiple spellings are attested from Mari and Terqa: gag-ga, ka-ak-ka and ka-ka.

Messenger god Kakka and medicine goddess Kakka
An unresolved problem in scholarship is whether there was more than one deity named Kakka. Piotr Steinkeller considers the Syrian Kakka from Mari and the Mesopotamian messenger god to be one and the same. Similarly, Wilfred G. Lambert assumes that the latter and a homophone of his name present in the Ninkarrak section of the god list An = Anum are identical. However, Ichiro Nakata considers the deity from Mari to be female, pointing at her equation with two female figures, Ninkarrak and Ninshubur, and her presence in theophoric names such as Kakka-asiya, "Kakka is a female physician." He considers her to be one of the three goddesses common in personal names in the kingdom of Mari but unknown from any other locations, alongside Admu and Annu. Julia M. Asher-Greve and Joan Goodnick Westenholz also consider Kakka from Mari to be female.

Another deity whose relation to the messenger god Kakka is unclear is the sukkal of Ningal, dMEkà-kàME. Manfred Krebernik assumes that they were analogous. Richard L. Litke  also considers Kakka the messenger god and Kakka the medicine goddess to be separate deities. He points out that the gloss is unlikely to point at an otherwise unknown pronunciation of the sign ME, and assumes that the deity in mention was named Meme, while an alternate version of the list had Kakka in the same line. He concludes that in this case Kakka should be understood as a deity elsewhere equated with Ninkarrak, distinct from the male messenger god.  According to Dietz-Otto Edzard, the sukkal of Ningal  was most likely a Gula-like medicine goddess, and the proposed association between her and the messenger god Kakka might be the result of confusion.

Character
Kakka was sometimes regarded as the sukkal (attendant or messenger deity) of Anu or, as attested in the Enūma Eliš, of Anshar. According to Piotr Steinkeller, it is uncertain how the latter tradition developed, as Kakka was generally not worshiped in Babylonia, where this text was composed. He tentatively proposes that identification between Anshar and Ashur might have been an older tradition than assumed, and that Kakka, as a god worshiped in at least some locations in Assyria, appears in this myth as a deity who could plausibly be assigned to Ashur as a courtier. The equation of Anshar and Assur is mostly known from a few neo-Assyrian fragments of a rewrite of Enuma Elish which also casts Ashur as the protagonist, described by Wilfred G. Lambert as "completely superficial in that it leaves the plot in chaos by attributing Marduk's part to his great-grandfather, without making any attempt to iron out the resulting confusion." It is assumed that it was only written during the reign of Sennacherib.

Kakka could be sometimes syncretised with Ninshubur (as early as in the Old Babylonian period) or with Papsukkal. Kakka and Ninshubur are identified with each other in the god list An = Anum, but only in the specific role of "one who holds the great scepter." One hymn compares Ninshubur to Kakka, but uses the feminine form of her name in the Emesal dialect, Gashanshubura. In the first millennium BCE Kakka was eclipsed and largely absorbed by Papsukkal, similar to other similar deities, Ninshubur and Ilabrat. In two versions of a single omen text, one associates the francolin (Akkadian: ittidû) with Kakka, but the other with Papsukkal. 

In Mari, Kakka was associated with Ninkarrak and Ninshubur and served as a medicine deity. A reference to Kakka as a healing deity is also known from an Akkadian incantation.

Worship
The cult center of Kakka was Maškan-šarrum. A tablet from Puzrish-Dagan from the reign of Amar-Sin states that a nin-dingir priestess of Kakka was present in that city. Its precise location is uncertain, though all experts agree that it was located in the southernmost part of historical Assyria, close to the border with Babylonia. Identification with Tell Meškin, located 47 kilometers to the northwest of Baghdad, has also been suggested. Much evidence for the worship of this deity is also available from Mari. 

Kakka appears in Akkadian and Amorite theophoric names, both feminine and masculine. Locations from which they are attested include Puzrish-Dagan, Ur, Lagash (in the Ur III period) and Nippur, Isin, Terqa, Mari and various settlements in the Diyala area (in later times). It is also possible that names with the element gag-ga or ga-ga, known from Sargonic Eshnunna and Gasur, refer to this deity. One of the sons of Ishbi-Erra bore the name Ishbi-Erra-naram-Kakka, "Ishbi-Erra is the beloved of Kakka." One of the kings of the later kingdom of Khana, known for evoking traditions of Mari, bore the name Iddin-Kakka. Due to the association between Kakka and Maškan-šarrum it has been proposed that Šū-Kakka, a king known from a seal impression found during excavations of Eshnunna, ruled over this city. He was most likely a contemporary of Bilalama of Eshnunna. Julia M. Asher-Greve and Joan Goodnick Westenholz, who assume the Kakka known from Mari was female, list her among the seven most popular goddesses in women's theophoric names from this city, next to Annu (possibly related to Annunitum), Ishtar, Ishara, Mami, Admu (a wife of Nergal) and Aya. Kakka is also attested in a single Hurrian name from Mari, Ḫazzip-Kakka.

Kakka was still worshiped in Assur in the neo-Assyrian period. While he could be equated with Papsukkal in god lists, he was venerated separately from him there.

Mythology
The male Kakka acts as Anu's messenger in the Sultantepe version of the myth Nergal and Ereshkigal, but the god fulfilling this role in the Amarna version is anonymous. Piotr Steinkeller argues that his presence in only one version of this myth might indicate that the name was an Assyrian addition. In the beginning of the composition, Kakka descends to the underworld on Anu's behalf to greet Ereshkigal and invite her to send a representative to the banquet held in heaven. He reappears in the end, when Anu tasks him with announcing Nergal's new status as the king of the underworld.

In Enūma Eliš, Anshar sends Kakka to tell his parents, Lahmu and Lahamu, that Tiamat is plotting against the gods.

References

Bibliography

External links
A hymn to Ninšubur (Ninšubur B) in the Electronic Text Corpus of Sumerian Literature

Mesopotamian gods
Mesopotamian goddesses
Messenger gods
Medicine goddesses
Characters in the Enūma Eliš